London History Day is an annual celebration in London that takes place on 31 May, the day that Big Ben first started keeping time.

History 
In May 2016 Historic England launched an online poll through YouGov asking the public to choose the most relevant date to celebrate London's history. 24% of people chose the day that Big Ben first keeping time in 1859. The first London History Day took place on 31 May 2017. Over 40 historic and cultural institutions hosted special events, or highlighted rare objects in their collection.

2020 
The fourth London History Day took place during the COVID-19 Pandemic. Historic England and Museum of London created a booklet to help families celebrate the day without leaving their homes. London residents were encouraged to celebrate from home by dressing up as a well known person in London history using items they could find in their homes.

References 

Holidays in England
Spring (season) events in England